John Giannantonio (born  1934) is a former American football player who set several national high school football records, many which still stand. During a game in November that season against Mountain Lakes High School he rushed for 754 yards and nine touchdowns in a 61–0 win. His 594.5 rushing yards per game average, season rushing yards total, and single-game rushing yards against Mountain Lakes remain national high school records as of 2021.

As a junior at Netcong, Giannantonio rushed for 38 touchdowns and had a 514-yard game. He then transferred to Bolles School in Jacksonville, Florida as a senior, but due to transfer rules, in order to retain his academic eligibility he did not play on the football team. After high school, he was offered a two-year scholarship to Notre Dame and a four-year scholarship to Villanova. He chose to attend Villanova and played on the varsity football team for three years but was unable to replicate his success from high school. After his playing career, he returned to New Jersey and taught mathematics in the Andover Regional School District at Andover Regional Middle School for 38 years before retiring in 1995.

See also
 Kenneth Hall (American football)

References

American football running backs
Living people
1930s births
Players of American football from New Jersey
Sportspeople from Morris County, New Jersey
Villanova Wildcats football players
American people of Italian descent